Medway is a conurbation and unitary authority in Kent, South East England.

Medway may also refer to:

People
 Medway (DJ), Jesse Skeens, American DJ and record producer
 Baron Medway, courtesy title given to the eldest son of the Earl of Cranbrook
 Gathorne Gathorne-Hardy, 1st Earl of Cranbrook (1814–1906), a British Conservative politician
 John Gathorne-Hardy, 2nd Earl of Cranbrook (1839–1911), Conservative Member of Parliament

Places

United Kingdom 
 Medway (UK Parliament constituency), former county constituency
 Medway Ports, Kent
 Medway Tunnel, tunnel under the River Medway linking Strood with Chatham
 Medway UTC, former name of a University Technical College in Chatham
 City of Rochester-upon-Medway (1974–1979), formerly District of Medway, Kent
 River Medway, in Sussex and Kent

United States 
 Medway, Kansas, in Medway Township, Hamilton County, Kansas
 Medway, Maine, a town in Penobscot County
 Medway, Massachusetts, a town in Norfolk County
 Medway station
 Medway, New York, see List of places in New York: M
 Medway, Ohio, an unincorporated community in Clark County
 Medway (Mount Holly, South Carolina), a plantation listed on the NRHP in South Carolina
 Medway, Vermont, a town in Rutland County, Vermont, United States

Multiple countries
 Medway River (disambiguation)

Other places 
 Medway, New South Wales, a village in the Southern Highlands, Australia
 Medway, Nova Scotia, a community in the Region of Queens Municipality, Canada
 Medway Community Forest, a community forest co-operative in Nova Scotia
 Medway Creek (Ontario), Canada

Aircraft
 Medway Microlights, a British aircraft manufacturer
 Medway Av8R, a microlight aircraft
 Medway EclipseR, a microlight aircraft
 Rolls-Royce Medway, an early 1960s turbofan engine

Ships
 HMS Medway, various Royal Navy ships and a shore establishment
 Medway (1801 ship), launched at Fort William, Calcutta in 1801
 Medway (1810 ship), launched at Frindsbury in 1810
 Medway (1902), a four-masted barque built in 1902 by A. McMillan & Son, Dumbarton, Scotland

See also 
 Midway (disambiguation)
 Battle of the Medway, AD 43
 Raid on the Medway, AD 1667